Pieter Gerhardus 'Hempies' du Toit  (born 23 August 1953 in Villiersdorp, Western Cape, South Africa) is a former South African rugby union player.

Playing career
After school, du Toit enrolled for a degree in agricultural management at the University of Stellenbosch, where he joined the university's rugby club and played regularly for the Maties from 1976 to 1987. Du Toit made his provincial debut for Western Province in 1979. He also played for representative teams such as the South African Barbarians, the Proteas and the Junior Springboks. In 1980 he represented the Junior Springboks against the touring British Lions team.

Du Toit was first selected for the Springboks in 1980 to tour South America. He did not play in any test matches on the South American tour and made his test debut for the Springboks during the 1981 tour of New Zealand in the first test on 15 August 1981 at Lancaster Park in Christchurch. He played a further four tests for the Springboks, two each against the 1982 South American Jaguars and the 1984 English touring team, respectively. Du Toit also played in 11 tour matches for the Springboks, scoring two non-test tries.

Test history

See also
List of South Africa national rugby union players – Springbok no. 516

References

1953 births
Living people
South African rugby union players
South Africa international rugby union players
Western Province (rugby union) players
Rugby union props
Alumni of Paul Roos Gymnasium
People from Theewaterskloof Local Municipality
Rugby union players from the Western Cape